This page list topics related to the Gambia.



B
Banjul
List of birds of the Gambia

C
Chief Justice of the Gambia
Cities in the Gambia
Communications in the Gambia

D
Demographics of the Gambia

E
Economy of the Gambia

F
Foreign relations of the Gambia

G
The Gambia and the Commonwealth of Nations
The Gambia at the Commonwealth Games
The Gambia at the 2010 Commonwealth Games
The Gambia at the 2018 Commonwealth Games
Gambia River
Gambian dalasi
Gambian pound
Geography of the Gambia
List of colonial governors of the Gambia

H
History of the Gambia

L
 LGBT rights in the Gambia (Gay rights)

M
Military of the Gambia
Music of the Gambia

P
Politics of the Gambia
Public holidays in the Gambia

S

Supreme Court of the Gambia

T
Transport in the Gambia

V
 Villages in the Gambia

W
 Wave-crasher

See also
Lists of country-related topics - similar lists for other countries

Lists
List of birds of the Gambia - List of heads of state of the Gambia - Public holidays in the Gambia

Gambia